Banatul Timișoara was a former football club in Timișoara, Romania. The team is named after the region Banat. The team was founded in 1923 and played in the County Championship in Timiș County. The best season for them is 1928–1929. In 1927,  former players at Sparta-Unirea CFR joined the team and created a stronger team winning the regional championship to qualify in 1928–29 Divizia A, the Romanian first division. The best performance of Banatul is to reach the semi-final in this season and be eliminated by Victoria Cluj. After World War II, they played in the Third League of Romania without notable performances. Banatul Timișoara disbanded in 1950.

They never played in Divizia A, the first league of Romania, since the foundation of the league format in 1932–33.

Performances
 Third Place : 1928–29

References

Literature

External links
Romaniansoccer.ro

Football clubs in Timiș County
Association football clubs disestablished in 1950
Liga I clubs
Liga II clubs
Association football clubs established in 1923
Defunct football clubs in Romania
1923 establishments in Romania